Mirzəqurbanlı is a village and municipality in the Neftchala Rayon of Azerbaijan. It has a population of 535. The municipality consists of the villages of Mirzəqurbanlı and Uzunbabalı.

References

Populated places in Neftchala District